Margarita Padín (1910–1993) was an Argentine stage and film actress.

Selected filmography
 Dancing (1933)
 Melgarejo (1937)
 Closed Door (1939)
 Mother Gloria (1941)

References

Bibliography
 Eva Franco. Un siglo de teatro en los ojos de una dama. Francotirador Ediciones, 1998.

External links

1910 births
1993 deaths
Argentine film actresses
Argentine stage actresses
People from Buenos Aires